Sulo Elis Cederström (11 February 1903 – 26 June 1944) was a Finnish sports shooter. He competed in the 25 m pistol event at the 1936 Summer Olympics. He was killed on the Karelian Isthmus, during the Winter War.

References

External links
 

1903 births
1944 deaths
Finnish male sport shooters
Olympic shooters of Finland
Shooters at the 1936 Summer Olympics
Finnish military personnel killed in World War II
People from Kouvola
Sportspeople from Kymenlaakso